Kaptai Dam is on the Karnaphuli River at Kaptai,  upstream from Chittagong in Rangamati District, Bangladesh. The primary purpose of the dam and reservoir was to generate hydroelectric power. Construction was completed in 1962, in then-East Pakistan. The generators in the  Karnafuli Hydroelectric Power Station were commissioned between 1962 and 1988. It is the only hydroelectric power station in Bangladesh.

History

A brief reconnaissance occurred in 1906 when the Karnafuli Hydropower Station was first contemplated. A second study was carried out in 1923. In 1946, E. A. Moore recommended the proposed project at Barkal about 65 kilometres upstream of present dam site at Kaptai. In 1950, the Marz Rendal Vatten Consulting Engineers suggested a site at Chilardak, about 45 kilometres upstream of Kaptai.

Under the guidance of the chief engineer (Irrigation) Khwaja Azimuddin, the construction site was chosen in 1951. Utah International Inc. was selected as a construction contractor. Construction of the dam started in 1957 and completed in 1962 during the era of President Ayub Khan.

Construction
Starting in 1957, the initial phase of the construction was completed in 1962. By this time the dam, spillway, penstock and two 40 MW Kaplan turbine generators were built in the power station. In August 1982 a 50 MW generator was commissioned. In October 1988 the fourth and fifth generating units, both 50 MW Kaplan-type turbines, were installed which raised the total generation capacity to 230 MW.

The total cost of Unit 1, Unit 2 and a part of Unit 3 was Rs. 503 million and the total cost of extension was Tk. 1,900 million. The project was financed by the East Pakistan Government (at the time), United States and the Overseas Economic Cooperation Fund.

Description

The construction of the dam submerged  area. This included  of cultivable land, 40 percent of the cultivable land in the area, and displaced 18,000 families and 100,000 tribal people, of which 70% were Chakma. The dam flooded the original Rangamati town and other structures.

Social and ecological effects
Inhabitants of the storage reservoir area who lost their homes and farmland due to flooding were not compensated. More than 40,000 Chakma tribals emigrated to Arunachal Pradesh, India. The scarcity of land is considered a main cause of the continuing conflict in the area.

The building of the dam and reservoir also caused destruction of wilderness and loss of wildlife and wildlife habitats.

Notes

External links

Dams Caused Environmental Refugees of Ethnic Minorities
Profile
Embankment Dams
Jum Cultivation and Environmental Degradation in CHT

Dams in Bangladesh
Earth-filled dams
Karnaphuli River
Buildings and structures in Chittagong Division
Rangamati Hill District
Dams completed in 1962
Economy of Chittagong Division
History of Chittagong Division
1962 establishments in East Pakistan

de:Karnaphulistausee